The Giro do Interior de São Paulo is a stage race held annually in São Paulo, Brazil. It was part of UCI America Tour in category 2.2 in 2010 and 2011.

Winners

References

Cycle races in Brazil
2008 establishments in Brazil
Recurring sporting events established in 2008
Sport in São Paulo
UCI America Tour races